Sardabeh (also Romanized as Sardābeh) is a village in Sardabeh Rural District, in the Central District of Ardabil County, Ardabil Province, Iran. At the 2006 census, its population was 11, in 4 families.

References 

Towns and villages in Ardabil County